The Dover and Delaware River Railroad  is a short-line railroad operating along  of track in the northern part of the U.S. state of New Jersey between Phillipsburg and Newark. It was created in 2019 to take over local freight operations from Norfolk Southern Railway between Phillipsburg and Newark, leasing and operating the Washington Secondary line between Phillipsburg and Hackettstown from Norfolk Southern Railway and acquiring trackage rights along NJ Transit's Morristown Line, Montclair-Boonton Line, and Gladstone Branch. The railroad also acquired small stretches of track in Washington, Wayne, and Totowa. The Dover and Delaware River Railroad interchanges with Norfolk Southern Railway in Phillipsburg.  
The DD is a wholly owned subsidiary of Chesapeake and Delaware, LLC.

References

External links

Official website

New Jersey railroads
Railway companies established in 2019
Spin-offs of the Norfolk Southern Railway
2019 establishments in New Jersey